The 2017–18 CBA season was the 23rd season of the Chinese Basketball Association (CBA). The regular season was initially scheduled to begin on Saturday, October 21, 2017, with the Guangdong Southern Tigers hosting the Shenzhen Leopards, but later rescheduled to Saturday, October 28, 2017, with the defending champion Xinjiang Flying Tigers hosting the Jilin Northeast Tigers. The regular season ended on Sunday, February 11, 2018, and the playoffs begin on Saturday, March 3, 2018.

In this season, the playoffs were expanded from eight to ten teams.

Team changes 
Two teams relocated and one of those teams was renamed ahead of the season.

City changes 
The Jiangsu Dragons relocated out of Nanjing and will play the majority of their home games in Suzhou with several contests hosted in Changzhou.

Name changes 
The Jiangsu Tongxi Monkey Kings moved from Changzhou to Nanjing and changed their name to the Nanjing Monkey Kings on September 29, 2017.

Venues

Draft 
The 2017 CBA Draft, the third edition of the CBA draft, took place on 2017 August 2. 11 players were selected in the draft.

Foreign players policy
All teams except the Bayi Rockets can have two foreign players. The bottom 4 teams from the previous season (except Bayi) have the additional right to sign an extra Asian player.

Rules Chart
The rules for using foreign players in each game are described in this chart:

+ Including players from Hong Kong and Taiwan.

++ If a team waives its right to sign an extra Asian player, it may use its 2 foreign players for 7 quarters collectively.

+++ Only 1 allowed in the 4th quarter.

Import chart
This is the full list of international players who competed in the CBA during the 2017-18 season.

Regular Season Standings

Playoffs

The 2018 CBA Playoffs began on 3 March 2018.

Statistics

Individual statistic leaders

Awards

Players of the Week
The following players were named the Players of the Week.

Young Player of the Month
The following players were named the Young Player of the Month.

Notes

References

External links
CBA Official Website
CBA China - 2017-18 Standings and Stats on Basketball-Reference.com

 
League
Chinese Basketball Association seasons
CBA